Todalsøra or Todalen is a village in Surnadal Municipality in Møre og Romsdal county, Norway. Todalen Church is located in this village.

It is located where the river Toåa empties into the Todalsfjorden. Norwegian County Road 671 ends in the village, the only road connecting the village to the rest of Norway. The mountain Vassnebba lies just to the west and the mountains Indre Sula and Ytre Sula lie just to the north..   

Leif Halse, a teacher, novelist, short story writer, children's writer, comics writer, and local historian, grew up in Todalen.

References

Villages in Møre og Romsdal
Surnadal